Melinde may refer to:

 Melinda, a female name
 Malindi (once known as Melinde), a town on the coast of Kenya